Agelena injuria is a species of spider in the family Agelenidae, which contains at least 1,315 species of funnel-web spiders . It has been described by Fox, in 1936. It is primarily found in China.

References

injuria
Spiders of China
Spiders described in 1936